Greggor Ilagan is an American politician who is currently the Hawaii state representative in Hawaii's 4th district. He won the seat after incumbent Democrat Joy San Buenaventura decided to run for a seat in the Hawaii Senate. He previously ran for Hawaii Senate in Hawaii's 2nd district, running in the primary against then-incumbent Russell Ruderman, losing the race 54.4% to 45.6%. He won election for his House seat in 2020 against Republican Hope Louise Cermelj, receiving 70.1% of the total vote.

References

21st-century American politicians
American politicians of Filipino descent
Asian-American people in Hawaii politics
Democratic Party members of the Hawaii House of Representatives
Hawaii politicians of Filipino descent
Living people
Year of birth missing (living people)